During World War II, Operation Zipper was a British plan to capture either Port Swettenham or Port Dickson, Malaya, as staging areas for the recapture of Singapore in Operation Mailfist. However, due to the end of the war in the Pacific, it was never fully executed. Some of the proposed landings on Penang went ahead as planned to probe Japanese intentions, encountering no resistance. The planned deception for this attack was called Operation Slippery, whilst a small Special Operations Executive team led by Tun Ibrahim Ismail which landed in October 1944 managed to convince the Japanese that the landings were to be on the Isthmus of Kra,  to the north.

Operations Jurist and Tiderace were put into action following the surrender of Japan, with the objectives of directly liberating Penang and Singapore respectively, followed by smaller amphibious landings on the coast of Selangor and Negeri Sembilan. Two Allied fleets set sail from Rangoon, with the Royal Navy's Task Force 11 headed for Penang under Operation Jurist, while the larger British and French fleet sailing on to Singapore under Operation Tiderace. The earlier liberation of Penang was intended to test Japanese intentions as a prelude to the eventual recapture of Singapore and the rest of Malaya.

The Japanese garrison in Penang surrendered on 2 September and the Royal Marines recaptured Penang Island the following day. Meanwhile, the Allied fleet arrived off Singapore on 4 September and accepted the surrender of the Japanese forces stationed on the island. A formal surrender ceremony was held in downtown Singapore on 12 September.

On 9 September, troops of the 25th Indian Division were landed in Selangor and Negeri Sembilan, capturing Port Dickson. After some delays, the Commonwealth force reached Kuala Lumpur on 12 September.

References

Bibliography
 Bose, Romen, "The End of the War: Singapore's Liberation and the aftermath of the Second World War", Marshall Cavendish, Singapore, 2005
 Christopher Bayly & Tim Harper, "Forgotten Wars: Freedom And Revolution in Southeast Asia", Penguin Group, United Kingdom, 2006, 

Zipper
Zipper
Zipper
Zipper
Military history of Malaya during World War II
Zipper